Yevgeny Kafelnikov was the defending champion and defended his title with 6–4, 6–4 against Magnus Larsson.

Seeds

Draw

Finals

Top half

Bottom half

References

Main Draw

1998 Gerry Weber Open